Charles Noel Workman (May 26, 1897 – August 29, 1975) was an American football player and coach of football, basketball, and baseball.  He was the head football coach at Simpson College from 1923 to 1925 and also at Iowa State University from 1926 to 1930, compiling a career college football coaching record of 33–30–5.  Workman was also the head basketball coach at Simpson from 1923 to 1926, tallying a mark of 29–22, and the head baseball coach at Simpson in 1923 and at Iowa State from 1929 to 1930, amassing a career college baseball coaching record of 15–27.

Workman graduated from Ohio State University in 1923.  He was the older brother of Hoge Workman, who was his teammate at Ohio State.

Head coaching record

Football

References

1897 births
1975 deaths
American football ends
Iowa State Cyclones baseball coaches
Iowa State Cyclones football coaches
Ohio State Buckeyes football coaches
Simpson Storm baseball coaches
Simpson Storm football coaches
Simpson Storm men's basketball coaches
Sportspeople from Huntington, West Virginia
Players of American football from West Virginia